Fast Hands is an album by American jazz vibraphonist Johnny Lytle which was recorded in 1980 for the Muse label.

Reception

AllMusic awarded the album 3 stars with a review stating, "This is an enjoyable album".

Track listing
All compositions by Johnny Lytle except as indicated
 "Sister Silver" - 5:45
 "Tomorrow" (Charles Strouse, Martin Charnin) - 6:10
 "Brightness" - 4:49
 Bein' Green" (Joe Raposo) - 4:41
 "The Man - 7:22
 "Blues to Be There" (Duke Ellington, Billy Strayhorn) - 4:56

Personnel 
Johnny Lytle - vibraphone, percussion  
Houston Person - tenor saxophone
Mickey Tucker - keyboards 
Mervyn Bronson  - bass
Idris Muhammad - drums
Lawrence Killian - congas, percussion
Fred Miller - percussion (track 2)

References 

1980 albums
Johnny Lytle albums
Muse Records albums